Ayabulela Gqamane (born 30 August 1989) is a South African cricketer. He was included in the Border cricket team for the 2015 Africa T20 Cup. In August 2018, he was named in the Border squad for the 2018 Africa T20 Cup. In April 2021, he was named in Northerns' squad, ahead of the 2021–22 cricket season in South Africa.

References

External links
 

1989 births
Living people
Sportspeople from Qonce
Cricketers from the Eastern Cape
South African cricketers
Border cricketers
Cape Town Blitz cricketers
Northerns cricketers
Warriors cricketers